Lake Sammamish  is a freshwater lake  east of Seattle in King County, Washington, United States. It lies east of Lake Washington and west of the Sammamish Plateau, and stretches from Issaquah in the south to Redmond in the north. At Issaquah it is fed by Issaquah Creek, and at Redmond it drains to Lake Washington via the Sammamish River, named after the native people who once lived along its entire length.

The  Lake Sammamish watershed stretches from Redmond through Bellevue, and Issaquah to Preston and Hobart, and consists of numerous creeks which flow into the lake. Issaquah Creek is the largest tributary, furnishing over 70% of the lake's inflow.

Development
The area surrounding Lake Sammamish has been, in recent times, the most rapidly growing suburban district in the Greater Seattle Metropolitan Area.  During the late 1990s and early 2000s, the cities of Redmond, Snoqualmie, Fall City, Issaquah and Bellevue have grown substantially. The city of Sammamish was incorporated in 1999 because of suburban growth.

Ecology and conservation
Historically, runoff from the high precipitation in the lake's watershed (nearly twice the 35 inches that Seattle gets each year) was absorbed by the surrounding forests. Loose, sponge-like forest soils virtually eliminated runoff during winter storms and recharged groundwater aquifers which then released fresh water to streams in the dry summer months. With rapid urbanization the forests have been replaced by impervious surfaces—roofs, roads, parking lots—and stormwater runoffs have increased flooding. The stormwater runoff carries sediment loads and toxic pollutants into streams and ultimately the lake, which generally has a negative impact on lake water clarity as well as fishes and wildlife.

In May, 2010 the federal government asked the town of Sammamish to restrict development within  from the lakeshore to protect local salmon and steelhead (Oncorhyncus mykiss) species. The report did not include Lake Sammamish kokanee salmon (Oncorhyncus nerka) among the species in trouble, although environmentalists and scientists said development along Lake Sammamish and tributary creeks have pushed the fish to the brink of extirpation. Despite resistance to the report by the city of Sammamish, Issaquah already limits development within  of the lake, Issaquah Creek and the East Fork of Issaquah Creek under the Shoreline Management Program. It is estimated that fewer than 100 Kokanee salmon remain in Lake Sammamish.

Beavers
The recent return of beaver (Castor canadensis) to Lake Sammamish worries City of Issaquah and Lake Sammamish State Park officials who state that the mammals will cause flooding and burrow under roadways. These officials are recommending relocation of the beaver families. On July 6, 2010, officials of the City of Issaquah have asked Washington Department of Fish and Wildlife to tear out a beaver dam on Tibbetts Creek in Lake Sammamish State Park because of concerns about potential flooding and barriers to salmon migration.

In contrast, research on watersheds in the Northern United States and Canada shows that beavers provide ecological benefits by creating ponds that increase fish and bird abundance and diversity.

Recreation and parks

Lake Sammamish is bordered by Marymoor Park at the lake's north end, Lake Sammamish State Park at its south end, and the East Lake Sammamish Trail. Lake Sammamish State Park provides nine public boat launches that can be accessed through a separate park entrance, for a fee, with parking and restroom facilities on site.

The public can access the lake's west shores at Redmond's Idylwood Park. The privately owned Vasa Park Resort, located in Bellevue, provides access from the west for a fee. Vasa Park offers one ramp for launching watercraft. Several  housing developments own small, private parks that provide lake access for their residents.

The main leisure activities include rowing, fishing, waterskiing, wakeboarding, wakesurfing, tubing, and jet skiing.

There is a public slalom course for waterskiing at the far north end of the lake, running from the west to the east. In the mid-1980s, local radio personality Pat O'Day proposed that the Seafair Cup hydroplane races be moved to Lake Sammamish from Lake Washington, an effort that was unsuccessful.

Lake Sammamish offers fishing enthusiasts a variety of species to pursue, including perch, smallmouth bass, largemouth bass, cutthroat trout, salmon, and steelhead trout, among others.

Events
Serial killer Ted Bundy abducted two women in broad daylight from the beach at Lake Sammamish State Park in 1974 by faking an injury and asking for their help.
Wife killer Randy Roth drowned his fourth wife Cynthia at Lake Sammamish in 1991 after taking off in a raft from Redmond's Idylwood Park.

References

External links

Lake Sammamish Overview and Detailed Graphs, King County, Washington
Save Lake Sammamish website
Lake Sammamish Regional Information
 

Lakes of Washington (state)
Lakes of King County, Washington